"Sexuality" is the ninth track on Billy Bragg's 1991 album, Don't Try This at Home. The song was released as a single which reached No. 27 on the UK charts and #2 on the U.S. alternative charts.

"Sexuality" is an anti-homophobia and generally sex-positive song. It was written by Bragg with Johnny Marr, who also plays guitar on the recording. The music video, which was conceived and directed by comedian Phill Jupitus, features Kirsty MacColl singing backing vocals as well as Jupitus himself. Jupitus has also performed, with Bragg,  a parody version of this song  named "Bestiality".

In November 2021, Bragg created a re-worded version of the song to reflect support for transgender rights.

Critical reception
Upon its release, David Quantick of NME described "Sexuality" as "the funniest and most determined record of the week" and noted the "straightforward and spunky melody". He added, "Bragg goes on marvellously with an absurd storm of rhymes, football teams and paeans to doing it with people of all sexes."

Chart positions

References

External links
Official Billy Bragg site

1991 singles
Billy Bragg songs
Songs written by Billy Bragg
Songs written by Johnny Marr
LGBT-related songs
Go! Discs singles